Edinburgh Hill is a narrow point projecting 650 m from the east coast of Varna Peninsula, Livingston Island in the South Shetland Islands, Antarctica into McFarlane Strait and ending up in a conspicuous rocky hill of elevation 180 m.  The point forms the northwest side of the entrance to Moon Bay.  The area was visited by early 19th century sealers.

The feature is named after the city of Edinburgh, Scotland.

Location
British mapping in 1968, Spanish in 1991, and Bulgarian in 2005 and 2009.

Maps
 L.L. Ivanov et al. Antarctica: Livingston Island and Greenwich Island, South Shetland Islands. Scale 1:100000 topographic map. Sofia: Antarctic Place-names Commission of Bulgaria, 2005.
 L.L. Ivanov. Antarctica: Livingston Island and Greenwich, Robert, Snow and Smith Islands. Scale 1:120000 topographic map.  Troyan: Manfred Wörner Foundation, 2009.

References
 SCAR Composite Antarctic Gazetteer.

Hills of Livingston Island
Headlands of Livingston Island